Thyridanthrax luminis is a species of bee fly in the family Bombyliidae.

References

Further reading

External links

 

Bombyliidae
Insects described in 1970